Tevin Terrell Jones (born December 26, 1992) is an American football wide receiver who is currently a member of the Saskatchewan Roughriders of the Canadian Football League (CFL).. He played college football at Memphis. Jones has also been a member of the Houston Texans, Kansas City Chiefs, Pittsburgh Steelers, Dallas Cowboys and Jacksonville Jaguars.

Professional career

Houston Texans
Jones signed with the Houston Texans as an undrafted free agent on May 6, 2016. He was waived on August 30, 2016. He was re-signed to the practice squad on December 14, 2016. He signed a reserve/future contract on January 16, 2017. He was waived on May 16, 2017.

Kansas City Chiefs
On June 6, 2017, Jones signed with the Kansas City Chiefs. He was waived on September 2, 2017.

Pittsburgh Steelers
On January 29, 2018, Jones signed a reserve/future contract with the Pittsburgh Steelers. He was waived on September 1, 2018 and was signed to the practice squad the next day. He signed a reserve/future contract on December 31, 2018. On August 31, 2019, Jones was waived by the Steelers and signed to the practice squad the next day. He was promoted to the active roster on November 14, 2019. He was waived on December 16, 2019.

Dallas Cowboys
On December 18, 2019, Jones was signed to the Dallas Cowboys' practice squad. On December 30, 2019, Jones was signed to a reserve/future contract. He was waived on September 5, 2020.

Saskatchewan Roughriders
Jones signed with the Saskatchewan Roughriders of the CFL on April 27, 2021. He was placed on the suspended list on July 3, 2021. He was released prior to the start of the season.

Jacksonville Jaguars
On July 30, 2021, Jones signed with the Jacksonville Jaguars. He was waived on August 31, 2021.

Saskatchewan Roughriders (II) 
On April 21, 2022 the Saskatchewan Roughriders announced that Jones had re-signed with the team.

References

External links
Memphis Tigers bio

1992 births
Living people
American football wide receivers
Dallas Cowboys players
Houston Texans players
Jacksonville Jaguars players
Kansas City Chiefs players
Memphis Tigers football players
People from League City, Texas
Pittsburgh Steelers players
Players of American football from Texas
Saskatchewan Roughriders players
Sportspeople from Harris County, Texas